Ivan Yordanov Kostov (born 23 December 1949, in Sofia) was the 47th Prime Minister of Bulgaria in office from May 1997 to July 2001 and leader of the Union of Democratic Forces (UDF) between December 1994 and July 2001. 

Ivan Kostov graduated in Economics from the Karl Marx Higher Institute of Economics (today's University of National and World Economy) in Sofia in 1974, and later earned a Ph.D. in Mathematical Modeling of Economic Processes from Sofia University. He then worked as an associate professor at Sofia Technical University and entered politics after the collapse of the Berlin Wall and the fall of the Bulgarian communist leader, Todor Zhivkov. Kostov became an economic expert for the Union of Democratic Forces (UDF). His political career began as Member of Parliament in the 7th Grand National Assembly in 1990 (he was an MP from 1990 to 2013) and he went on to become Bulgaria's Finance Minister in the two consecutive governments of Dimitar Popov (December 1990 – October 1991) and Filip Dimitrov (November 1991 – December 1992).

Chairman of the UDF and Prime Minister 

Kostov was elected chairman of the UDF in 1994. During the winter of 1996/1997, mass protests took place against Bulgarian Socialist Party's government. The causes for the complete crisis were hyperinflation, unemployment and food shortages. The protests ultimately led to the fall of the socialist government. The UDF won the May 1997 elections, and Kostov became Bulgaria's Prime Minister, his cabinet eventually became the country's first post-communist government to serve its full 4-year term.

Kostov is credited with turning around his country's fortunes, implementing the currency board in Bulgaria, removing price controls and creating a modern market economy, which put it on the path of sustainable economic growth. Under his government, long-delayed economic reforms were carried out, including privatization of state-owned enterprises was carried on a large scale and the country started long-sought accession talks with the European Union (which Bulgaria joined on January 1, 2007).

In foreign affairs, Ivan Kostov followed a strongly pro-EU and pro-NATO course, putting the country on a firm path of integration with the EU and NATO. As a part of the pro-NATO stance of his government, during the war in Kosovo he showed leadership by allowing NATO but not Russia to use Bulgaria's airspace despite overwhelming opposition in Bulgaria to the NATO air campaign against Yugoslavia and daily protest marches led by the Bulgarian Socialist Party. This single act prevented Russia from resupplying its forces occupying Pristina airport, thus denying the Russians a foothold in Kosovo. This decision ensured the success of the NATO bombing of Yugoslavia and the Kosovo War and ultimately led to a visit to Sofia by US President Bill Clinton in 1999. Against the insistence of the United States, Kostov didn't allow refugees from Kosovo to enter Bulgaria, but arranged for them to be temporarily settled in the Republic of Macedonia instead.

Kostov's rule was characterized by media claims for massive mismanagement and corruption, none of which have been proven. A number of major Soviet era enterprises that were already bankrupt and in the process of liquidation were sold to the highest bidder below the price of their assets because of the tremendous debts these enterprises had. This was done to allow the new investor to save the jobs of the employees, who would otherwise have to immediately lose their job because these enterprises were in a procedure of liquidation to pay off their creditors. This sale under the book value of assets has been misused by critics of Kostov's government since in unfounded accusations of corruption. While successful in stabilizing the country, Bulgaria's current account balance started growing negative..

Some of Kostov's privatization policies were criticized by his opponents from the Bulgarian Socialist Party. Ultimately the UDF lost in the June 2001 election to the newly formed National Movement Simeon II. Kostov resigned as chair of the UDF and eventually left the party to establish, in 2004, a new political party, Democrats for a Strong Bulgaria (DSB). He chaired DSB until June 2013.

Support for Fiscal Rules
In 2010, the GERB government of Prime Minister Boyko Borisov proposed instituting a tight fiscal rule in the Bulgarian Constitution, namely that the budget deficit could not exceed 2% of GDP in any one year. The proposal was supported by Ivan Kostov and his party Democrats for a Strong Bulgaria and Parliament adopted it in November 2010. Kostov's DBS supported several other initiatives by GERB's government, including the ban on smoking in public places, and the pension reform proposed by Finance Minister Simeon Djankov.

Personal
He is married to Elena Kostova. Kostov's hobby is tennis and he is also an avid follower of chess.

References

Bibliography

External links 
 Speeches, Interviews and Photos
 Otgovori.eu: Ivan Kostov's answers to a large variety of questions

1949 births
Living people
Politicians from Sofia
Union of Democratic Forces (Bulgaria) politicians
Bulgarian conservatives
Finance ministers of Bulgaria
Prime Ministers of Bulgaria
20th-century Bulgarian economists
Sofia University alumni
University of National and World Economy alumni